Bergman is a small lunar impact crater that is located on the far side of the Moon. It was named after Swedish astronomer Torbern O. Bergman. It is located on the interior floor of the walled plain Mendeleev, and is attached to the edge of the inner wall to the northwest. On the same walled basin are the craters Moissan to the south and Richards to the west. The rim of Bergman is roughly circular, and the formation is generally bowl-shaped. The western half of the interior floor is covered with a slope of scree, leaving a small level floor on the eastern side.

References

External links

 LTO-66D2 Bergman — L&PI topographic map

Impact craters on the Moon